Rangamati Sadar is an Upazila of Rangamati District in the Division of Chittagong, Bangladesh.

Geography
It has a total area 546.49 km2.

Demographics

According to the 2011 Bangladesh census, Rangamati Sadar Upazila had 26,872 households and a population of 124,728, 67.3% of whom lived in urban areas. 8.4% of the population was under the age of 5. The literacy rate (age 7 and over) was 64.5%, compared to the national average of 51.8%.

Administration
Rangamati Sadar Upazila is divided into Rangamati Municipality and six union parishads: Balukhali, Bandukbhanga, Jibtali, Kutukchari, Mogban, and Sapchari. The union parishads are subdivided into 21 mauzas and 178 villages.

Education

According to Banglapedia, Rangamati Government High School, founded in 1862, and Lakers Public School are notable secondary schools.

See also
Upazilas of Bangladesh
Districts of Bangladesh
Divisions of Bangladesh

References

Upazilas of Rangamati Hill District